Flavobacterium croceum is a Gram-negative, rod-shaped and non-motile bacterium from the genus of Flavobacterium which has been isolated from activated sludge from Pohang in Korea.

References

 

croceum
Bacteria described in 2006